Alan Eggleston (born 30 December 1941) is an Australian former politician who served as a Liberal member of the Australian Senate from 1996 to 2014 representing Western Australia.

Career

Early career 
He was born in Busselton, Western Australia, and was educated at the University of Western Australia, where he studied medicine, and at Murdoch University, where he graduated in arts.

Professional career 
He was a medical practitioner in Port Hedland, Western Australia, serving from 1974 until 1996. He was a councillor in Port Hedland serving from 1988 until 1996 and mayor serving from 1993 until 1996. He was a member of the Pilbara Development Commission from 1994 until 1996.

Personal life 
He has achondroplasia, a common cause of dwarfism. He retired from all of his other political jobs to be a senator.
On 9 April 2012, Eggleston announced that he would not be standing in the 2013 Australian federal election, and would retire at the end of his term in 2014.

References

External links 
Official website

1941 births
Living people
Liberal Party of Australia members of the Parliament of Australia
Members of the Australian Senate for Western Australia
People with dwarfism
People from Busselton
Murdoch University alumni
University of Western Australia alumni
Mayors of places in Western Australia
Australian medical doctors
21st-century Australian politicians
20th-century Australian politicians
Western Australian local councillors